The 2004–05 Cypriot Fourth Division was the 20th season of the Cypriot fourth-level football league. Frenaros FC won their 1st title.

Format
Fourteen teams participated in the 2004–05 Cypriot Fourth Division. All teams played against each other twice, once at their home and once away. The team with the most points at the end of the season crowned champions. The first three teams were promoted to the 2005–06 Cypriot Third Division and the last three teams were relegated to regional leagues.

Point system
Teams received three points for a win, one point for a draw and zero points for a loss.

Changes from previous season
Teams promoted to 2004–05 Cypriot Third Division
 Othellos Athienou
 Achyronas Liopetriou
 ENAD Polis Chrysochous

Teams relegated from 2003–04 Cypriot Third Division
 Ethnikos Latsion FC
 Anagennisi Germasogeias
 Sourouklis Troullon

Teams promoted from regional leagues
 Atromitos Yeroskipou
 Digenis Oroklinis
 THOI Avgorou

Teams relegated to regional leagues
 Rotsidis Mammari
 PEFO Olympiakos

League standings

Results

See also
 Cypriot Fourth Division
 2004–05 Cypriot First Division
 2004–05 Cypriot Cup

Sources

Cypriot Fourth Division seasons
Cyprus
2004–05 in Cypriot football